Tony Conquest (born 7 July 1984) is an English professional boxer who held the Commonwealth cruiserweight title in 2014. He also held the Southern Area and WBO International cruiserweight titles in 2012.

References

External links

Image - Tony Conquest

1984 births
Cruiserweight boxers
English male boxers
Heavyweight boxers
Living people
People from Camden Town
Boxers from Greater London